Shangli County is a county in the west of Jiangxi province, China, bordering Hunan province to the west. It is under the jurisdiction of the prefecture-level city of Pingxiang.

Administrative divisions
Shangli County has 6 towns and 3 townships.
6 towns

3 townships
 Jiguanshan
 Changping
 Dongyuan

Demographics 

Notes and references 

County-level divisions of Jiangxi